The National Election Board of Ethiopia (NEBE) is an autonomous federal government agency which supervises the national elections of Ethiopia. The NEBE was established by Proclamation number 64/1992, and answers to the House of Peoples' Representatives.

History

The election board was established by Article 102 of the 1995 Constitution of Ethiopia.Article 102Election Board
1. There shall be established a National Election Board independent of any influence, to conduct in an impartial manner free and fair election in Federal and State constituencies.
2. Members of the Board shall be appointed by the House of Peoples' Representatives upon recommendation of the Prime Minister. Particulars shall be determined by law.

Structure
The NEBE consists of two components: the Board and the Secretariat. According to Article 6 of the amended Proclamation number 532/2006, the Board of the NEBE consists of nine members who are nominated by the prime minister and appointed by the House of Peoples' Representatives. These members are selected based on national diversity, and gender representation. The Secretariat is the operational branch of NEBE. The Secretariat is headed by a Chief Executive, and has the responsibility for the preparation and conduct of the electoral process.

Reforms
In November 2018, during the prime ministership of Abiy Ahmed that started in April 2018 promising major reforms, the judge Birtukan Mideksa was appointed as the head of NEBE.

See also
 Elections in Ethiopia

References

External links 
 

Ethiopia
Government of Ethiopia